The 1953 British Columbia general election was the 24th general election in the Province of British Columbia, Canada. It was held to elect members of the Legislative Assembly of British Columbia. The election was called on April 10, 1953, and held on June 9, 1953.  The new legislature met for the first time on September 15, 1953.

The minority government formed in 1952 by the conservative Social Credit party of Premier W.A.C. Bennett lasted only nine months before new elections were called.  Social Credit was re-elected with a majority in the legislature to a second term in government with almost 38% of the popular vote.

The social democratic Co-operative Commonwealth Federation formed the official opposition with the only significant opposition caucus (14 seats).

The British Columbia Liberal Party lost two of its six seats despite maintaining its 23% share of the popular vote.

The Progressive Conservative Party lost three of its four seats in the legislature, as its share of the popular vote fell from almost 17% to under 6%.

One seat was won by a Labour candidate.

Results

Notes:

* Party did not nominate candidates in the previous election.

x - less than 0.005% of the popular vote.

Results by riding

|-
||    
|align="center"|William Ralph Talbot Chetwynd<small>
|align="center"  |Cariboo<small>Social Credit
||    
||    
|align="center"  |Alberni<small>CCF
|align="center"|Stanley John Squire<small>
||    
|-
||    
|align="center"|William Kenneth Kiernan<small>
|align="center"  |Chilliwack<small>Social Credit
||    
||    
|align="center"  |Atlin<small>CCF
|align="center"|Frank Calder<small>
||    
|-
||    
|align="center"|Richard Orr Newton<small>
|align="center"  |Columbia<small>Social Credit
||    
||    
|align="center"  |Burnaby<small>CCF
|align="center"|Ernest Edward Winch<small>
||    
|-
||    
|align="center"|Thomas Irwin<small>
|align="center"  |Delta<small>Social Credit
||    
||    
|align="center"  |Comox<small>CCF
|align="center"|William Campbell Moore
||    
|-
||    
|align="center"|Lyle Wicks<small>
|align="center"  |Dewdney<small>Social Credit
||    
||    
|align="center"  |Cowichan-Newcastle<small>CCF
|align="center"|Robert Martin Strachan2
||    
|-
||    
|align="center"|Llewllyn Leslie King<small>
|align="center"  |Fort George<small>Social Credit
||    
||    
|align="center"  |Cranbrook<small>CCF
|align="center"|Leo Thomas Nimsick
||    
|-
||    
|align="center"|Philip Arthur Gaglardi<small>
|align="center"  |Kamloops<small>Social Credit
||    
||    
|align="center"  |Grand Forks-Greenwood<small>CCF
|align="center"|Rupert Haggen
||    
|-
||    
|align="center"|Herbert Joseph Bruch
|align="center"  |Esquimalt<small>Social Credit
||    
||    
|align="center"  |Kaslo-Slocan<small>CCF
|align="center"|Randolph Harding
||    
|-
||    
|align="center"|Wesley Drewett Black<small>
|align="center"  |Nelson-Creston<small>Social Credit
||    
||    
|align="center"  |Mackenzie<small>CCF
|align="center"|Anthony John Gargrave
||    
|-
||    
|align="center"|Lorne Shantz<small>
|align="center"  |North Okanagan<small>Social Credit
||    
||    
|align="center"  |New Westminster<small>CCF
|align="center"|Rae Eddie
||    
|-
||    
|align="center"|George Henry Tomlinson Jr.
|align="center"  |North Vancouver<small>Social Credit
||    
||    
|align="center"  |Revelstoke<small>CCF
|align="center"|Vincent Segur
||    
|-
||    
|align="center"|Cyril Morley Shelford
|align="center"  |Omineca<small>Social Credit
||    
||    
|align="center"  |Skeena<small>CCF
|align="center"|Frank Howard
||    
|-
||    
|align="center"|Charles William Parker<small>
|align="center"  |Peace River<small>Social Credit
||    
||    
|align="center" rowspan=2 |Vancouver East<small>CCF
|align="center"|Arthur James Turner
||    
|-
||    
|align="center"|Robert Edward Sommers<small>
|align="center"  |Rossland-Trail<small>Social Credit
||    
||    
|align="center"|Arnold Alexander Webster
||    
|-
||    
|align="center"|John Douglas Tidball Tisdalle
|align="center"  |Saanich<small>Social Credit
||    
||    
|align="center"  |Fernie<small>Labour (Party)
|align="center"|Thomas Aubert Uphill
||    
|-
||    
|align="center"|James Allan Reid<small>
|align="center"  |Salmon Arm<small>Social Credit
||    
||    
|align="center"  |Lillooet<small>Liberal
|align="center"|James Gordon Gibson
||    
|-
||    
|align="center"|Frank Richter, Jr.<small>
|align="center"  |Similkameen<small>Social Credit
||    
||    
|align="center"  |Oak Bay<small>Liberal
|align="center"|Philip Archibald Gibbs
||    
|-
||    
|align="center"|William Andrew Cecil Bennett1
|align="center"  |South Okanagan<small>Social Credit
||    
||    
|align="center"  |Prince Rupert<small>Liberal
|align="center"|Arthur Bruce Brown
||    
|-
||    
|align="center"|Eric Charles Fitzgerald Martin<small>
|align="center" rowspan=2 |Vancouver-Burrard<small>Social Credit
||    
||    
|align="center"  |Vancouver-Point Grey<small>Liberal
|align="center"|Arthur Laing
||    
|-
||    
|align="center"|Bert Price<small>
||    
||    
|align="center"  |Nanaimo and the Islands<small>Progressive Conservative
|align="center"|Larry Giovando
|}|    
|-
||    
|align="center"|Alexander Small Matthew
|align="center" rowspan=2  |Vancouver Centre<small>Social Credit
||    
|-
||    
|align="center"|George Churchill Moxham
||    
|-
||    
|align="center"|Thomas Audley Bate<small>
|align="center" rowspan=2 |Vancouver-Point Grey<small>Social Credit
||    
|-
||    
|align="center"|Robert William Bonner<small>
||    
|-
||    
|align="center"|Lydia Arsens
|align="center" rowspan=3 |Victoria City<small>Social Credit
||    
|-
||    
|align="center"|William Neelands Chant
||    
|-
||    
|align="center"|Walter Percival Wright
||    
|-
||    
|align="center"|Irvine Finlay Corbett<small>
|align="center" |Yale<small>Social Credit
||    
|-
|
|align="center"|1 Premier-Elect
|align="center"|2 Leader of the Opposition
|-
|-
| align="center" colspan="10"|Source: Elections BC
|-
|}

See also
List of British Columbia political parties
History and use of the Single Transferable Vote

1953
British Columbia
1953 in British Columbia
British Columbia general election